Benjamin Albert Glusing (February 3, 1916 – May 3, 2016) was an American politician. He served as a Democratic member in the Texas House of Representatives from 1953 to 1963.

References

1916 births
2016 deaths
Members of the Texas House of Representatives
American centenarians
Men centenarians